Xu Ziyin (Chinese: 徐紫茵; Korean: 쉬쯔인; born Luo Ruihua [罗瑞华]; May 6, 1996), also known as Roada Xu, is a Chinese singer, songwriter, and actress under T Entertainment. She is best known for participating in the girl group survival shows Youth With You (season 2) and Girls Planet 999.

Early life 
Xu Ziyin was born as Luo Ruihua on May 6, 1996 in Xiamen, Fujian, China. She started singing from a young age and uploaded many song covers on the music platform 5sing since 2008, when she was 13 years old. She graduated from Xiamen Shuangshi High School in 2014, and in 2018, she graduated from the Beijing Film Academy, placing first in her specialized course.

Career 
Xu was qualified to be a trainee in several South Korean entertainment companies, but she never signed contracts with them to focus on her studies.

In 2008, Xu was qualified to be a trainee for JYP Entertainment.

In 2011, Xu was qualified to be a trainee for SM Entertainment.

In 2013, Xu was qualified to be a trainee for Cube Entertainment.

In 2018, Xu participated in Dragon TV's idol survival show The Next Top Bang.

In March 2019, Xu starred in the film Song of Youth as Li Haiyan. In June 2019, she acted in the drama Young Blood as Xiao Hua.

In the beginning of 2020, Xu participated in the girl group survival show Youth With You (season 2), where she finished in 18th place. On June 27, she performed the song "想见你想见你想见你" at the "Hello Future - Graduation Songs 2020" concert, and on August 8, she took part in the K11 x TME music festival "Born To Be Impatient", performing the song "做梦" with Joyce Chu. On October 4, 2020, Xu released her first OST, "Say Yes", for the drama Love is Sweet. In November and December 2020, she participated in the exploration variety show Bird Girls along with three other contestants from Youth With You (season 2). On December 14, Xu attended the 2020 Sina Fashion Style Awards and won the "Fashion Potential Artist of the Year" award. Later that month, on December 30, she released the song "My Gravity (地心引力)", which was also the first song of her first self-composed EP "IN".

On February 19, 2021, Xu released her first self-composed EP "IN", which was composed of the songs "My Gravity (地心引力)", "Hunger (饿意)", and "VIBE". An MV for "VIBE" was later released on February 25. On March 30, 2021, Xu released the OST "Love Letter" for the drama In Love With Your Dimples.

On July 18, 2021, Xu was officially announced as a contestant in Mnet's upcoming survival show Girls Planet 999. Despite being able to survive in the second elimination round, she left the show shortly after the announcement due to health issues and finished 9th in C-Group.

On January 26, 2022, Xu acted as Han Tengteng for the drama Shining For One Thing. On September 26, 2022, Xu Ziyin signed to Sony Music.

Awards and achievements

Discography

Extended plays

Soundtrack appearances

Youth With You (Season 2)

Filmography

Film

Television series

Television shows

Fandom

Name 
 Routuan (Chinese: 肉团); meaning "meatball".

Color 
 Ziyin color (Chinese: 紫茵色); a mix of purple and silver, and a wordplay on her name as "zi" means purple and "yin" sounds like silver in Chinese.

References

External links 
 Xu Ziyin on Sina Weibo (in Chinese)
 Xu Ziyin on Instagram
 Xu Ziyin on Douyin (in Chinese)
 Xu Ziyin on Xiaohongshu (in Chinese)
 Xu Ziyin on Bilibili (in Chinese)

1996 births
Living people
People from Xiamen
Chinese pop singers
21st-century Chinese women singers
Chinese film actresses
Chinese television actresses
21st-century Chinese actresses
Actresses from Fujian
Girls Planet 999 contestants
Youth With You contestants